Harakovce is a village and municipality in Levoča District in the Prešov Region of central-eastern Slovakia.

History
In historical records the village was first mentioned in 1272.

Geography
The municipality lies at an altitude of 610 metres and covers an area of  (2020-06-30/-07-01).

Population 
It has a population of 59 people (2020-12-31).

Genealogical resources

The records for genealogical research are available at the state archive "Statny Archiv in Levoca, Slovakia":
 Roman Catholic church records (births/marriages/deaths): 1669-1898 (parish B)

See also
 List of municipalities and towns in Slovakia

References

External links
Statistics
Eurostat Statistics
Surnames of living people in Harakovce

Villages and municipalities in Levoča District